Pupi Poisson (born April 2, 1982), is a Spanish drag performer most known for competing on the reality television series Drag Race España. Pupi Poisson is the stage name of Alberto Zimmer, who began as a drag performer in 2006.

Career
Pupi Poisson began performing in drag in 2006 following a stint at a theme park which helped Zimmer create this role. In 2008 Poisson began to perform with other drag queens, and television appearances followed in 2010. She has competed on Got Talent España as well as Drag Race España. In an interview with one of the judges on the show, Javier Calvo, he called her "very talented," and noted that she had been "working for a while."

From July to December 2021, Poisson was part of the show Gran Hotel de las Reinas, which toured Spain as the official tour of Drag Race España.

In 2022, Pupi will begin co-hosting Reinas al Rescate alongside Drag Race España host Supremme de Luxe and fellow contestants Estrella Xtravaganza and Sharonne. In the series, the four drag queens travel across Spain to recruit small-town residents to participate in one-night-only drag shows.

Personal life
Zimmer lives in Madrid. He is gay, noting in a July 2021 interview that he hid it because he believed it would not be "well received" by his mother.

Discography

Albums
 Pupi Poisson (2019)

Singles
 "Sex Dance Love" (2013)
 "Armas De Mujer" (2014)
 "Armas De Mujer" [Dmoreno Remix] (2014)
 "Tienes Tó La Cara (Bso) Umpp" (2017)
 "Inesperado" (2020)
 "Prima'S Song" (2020)
 "Ya Es Navidad 2020" (2020)

 As featured artist
 "Kobritzska", Conchita Pelayo feat. Pupi Poisson (2019)
 "Inesperat", Jean Val feat. Pupi Poisson (2020)

Filmography

Television
 ¿Quién quiere casarse con mi madre? (2013)
 Got Talent España (2017)
 Drag Race España (season 1) (2021) (4th Place and Miss Congeniality)
 Maestros de la costura (2022) (guest appearance)
 Drag Race España (season 2) (2022) (guest appearance)
 Reinas al Rescate (2022)

References

External links
 
 Pupi Poisson at IMDb

1982 births
Living people
Drag Race España contestants
Gay entertainers
People from Madrid
Spanish drag queens
Spanish LGBT entertainers